Anderson Fork is a stream in Clinton and Greene counties, Ohio, in the United States.

Anderson Fork was named for Richard C. Anderson, a government surveyor.

Location

Mouth: Confluence with Caesar Creek, Clinton County at 
Source: Clinton County at

See also
List of rivers of Ohio

References

Rivers of Clinton County, Ohio
Rivers of Greene County, Ohio
Rivers of Ohio